Killeen Independent School District is a public school district based in Killeen, Texas (USA).

In addition to Killeen, the district serves the cities of Harker Heights and Nolanville as well as all students residing at Fort Hood. The district covers western Bell County and a small portion of Coryell County.

In 2010, the school district was rated "recognized" by the Texas Education Agency.

Schools

High Schools (Grades 9-12)
Chaparral High School
Early College High School 
Ellison High School 
Harker Heights High School (Harker Heights)
Killeen High School
Shoemaker High School

Middle Schools (Grades 6-8)

 Audie Murphy
 53393 Sun Dance Drive Fort Hood, TX 76544
 Charles E. Patterson
 8383 W. Trimmier Road Killeen, TX 76542
 Eastern Hills
 300 Indian Trail Harker Heights, TX 76548
 Gateway (Middle School)
 1307 Gowen Drive Killeen, TX 76543
 Liberty Hill
 4500 Kit Carson Trail Killeen, TX 76542
 Live Oak Ridge
 2600 Robinett Road Killeen, TX 76549
 Manor
 1700 S. W.S. Young Drive Killeen, TX 76543
 Nolan
 1600 Warriors Path Harker Heights, TX 76548
 Palo Alto
 2301 W. Elms Road Killeen, TX 76549
 Rancier
 3301 Hilliard Avenue Killeen, TX 76543
 Roy J. Smith
 6000 Brushy Creek Drive Killeen, TX 76549
 Union Grove
 101 E. Iowa Drive Harker Heights, TX 76548

Elementary Schools (Grades PK-5)
 Alice W. Douse
 700 Rebecca Lynn Lane Killeen, TX 76542
 Brookhaven
 3221 Hilliard Avenue Killeen, TX 76543
 Cedar Valley
 4801 Chantz Drive Killeen, TX 76542
 Clarke
 51612 Comanche Avenue Fort Hood, TX 76544
 Clear Creek
 4800 Washington Street Fort Hood, TX 76544
 Clifton Park
 1801 S. 2nd Street Killeen, TX 76541
 Dr. Joseph A. Fowler
 4910 Katy Creek Lane Killeen, TX 76549
 Harker Heights (Elementary)
 726 S. Ann Boulevard Harker Heights, TX 76548
 Hay Branch
 6101 Westcliff Road Killeen, TX 76543
 Haynes
 3309 W. Canadian River Loop Killeen, TX 76549
 Iduma
 4400 Foster Lane Killeen, TX 76549
 Ira Cross
 1910 Herndon Drive Killeen, TX 76543
 Killeen (Elementary)
 1608 E. Rancier Avenue Killeen, TX 76541
 Maude Moore Wood
 6410 Morganite Lane Killeen, TX 76542
 Maxdale
 2600 Westwood Drive Killeen, TX 76549
 Meadows
 423 27th Street Fort Hood, TX 76544
 Montague Village
 84001 Clements Drive Fort Hood, TX 76544
 Mountain View
 500 Mountain Lion Road Harker Heights, TX 76548
 Nolanville
 901 Old Nolanville Road Nolanville, TX 76559
 Oveta Culp Hobby
 53210 Lost Moccasin Fort Hood, TX 76544
 Pat Carney
 5501 Azura Way Killeen, TX 76542
 Peebles
 1800 N. W.S. Young Drive Killeen, TX 76543
 Pershing Park
 1500 W. Central Texas Expressway Killeen, TX 76549
 Reeces Creek
 400 W. Stan Schlueter Loop Killeen, TX 76542
 Richard E. Cavazos
 1200 N. 10th Street Nolanville, TX 76559
 Saegert
 5600 Schorn Drive Killeen, TX 76542
 Skipcha
 515 Prospector Trail Harker Heights, TX 76548
 Timber Ridge
 5402 White Rock Drive Killeen, TX 76542
 Trimmier
 4400 Success Drive Killeen, TX 76542
 Venable Village
 60160 Venable Road Fort Hood, TX 76544
 Willow Springs
 2501 W. Stan Schlueter Loop Killeen, TX 76549

References

External links
Killeen ISD

School districts in Bell County, Texas
School districts in Coryell County, Texas